Horacio Miranda (born 20 September 1931) is a Filipino former sports shooter. He competed at the 1960 Summer Olympics, 1964 Summer Olympics, the 1968 Summer Olympics and 1962 and 1966 Asian Games.

References

External links
 

1931 births
Living people
Filipino male sport shooters
Olympic shooters of the Philippines
Shooters at the 1960 Summer Olympics
Shooters at the 1964 Summer Olympics
Shooters at the 1968 Summer Olympics
Sportspeople from Manila
Asian Games medalists in shooting
Shooters at the 1962 Asian Games
Shooters at the 1966 Asian Games
Asian Games silver medalists for the Philippines
Asian Games bronze medalists for the Philippines
Medalists at the 1966 Asian Games
20th-century Filipino people